Chrześcijańska Demokracja or Chadecja can refer to several parties in Poland that are connected to the Christian democracy movements:
in the Second Polish Republic:
 Christian Democracy - Labor Party (Chrześcijańska Demokracja - Stronnictwo Pracy)
 Polish Christian Democratic Party (Polskie Stronnictwo Chrześcijańskiej Demokracji)
 Christian Union of National Unity (Chrześcijański Związek Jedności Narodowej), commonly known as Chjena
in the Third Polish Republic
 Christian Democracy of the 3rd Republic of Poland (Chrześcijańska Demokracja III Rzeczypospolitej Polskiej)

See also: Chieno-Piast

pl:Chadecja